Maffra was a major station located in the town of Maffra, on the now closed Maffra railway line in Victoria, Australia. It was 212 km from Southern Cross station.

History
The line was opened in 1887 and in 1889, a branchline was constructed from Maffra to Briagolong. Rail passenger services between Traralgon and Maffra ceased in 1977 and regular freight trains ended in 1983, when through services from Orbost and Bairnsdale were routed via the parallel Traralgon–Sale–Stratford railway.

The rail line between Traralgon and Maffra was closed in stages from 1987, with Maffra station continued to be served by freight 
trains from Stratford intermittently until 1993. A number of special passenger trains visited Maffra on occasions, including a steam hauled service from Melbourne hauled by locomotive K153 in August 1990. The station remained staffed by a station master until the final closure and the rail tracks were removed over the next two years. The station precinct is now an industrial precinct and the former station building is used for community purposes.

References 

Disused railway stations in Victoria (Australia)
Transport in Gippsland (region)
Shire of Wellington